Mizrahi Hebrew, or Eastern Hebrew, refers to any of the pronunciation systems for Biblical Hebrew used liturgically by Mizrahi Jews: Jews from Arab countries or east of them and with a background of Arabic, Persian or other languages of Asia. As such, Mizrahi Hebrew is actually a blanket term for many dialects.

Sephardi Hebrew is not considered one of these, even if it has been spoken in the Middle East and North Africa. The Sephardim were expellees from Spain and settled among the Mizrahim, but in countries such as Syria and Morocco, there was a fairly high degree of convergence between the Sephardi and the local pronunciations of Hebrew. Yemenite Hebrew is also considered quite separate, as it has a wholly different system for the pronunciation of vowels.

The same terms are sometimes used for the pronunciation of Modern Hebrew by Jews of Mizrahi origins. It is generally a compromise between Modern Standard Hebrew and the traditional liturgical pronunciation as described in this article.

Features

The following features are generally found in the pronunciation of Jews from Arabic-speaking countries, and the variations tend to follow the Arabic dialect of the country in question.
The stress tends to fall on the last syllable wherever that is the case in Biblical Hebrew.
 (Aleph) is pronounced with a clear glottal stop  except when it is used as a mater lectionis.
 (Gimel without dagesh) is pronounced  (voiced velar fricative) like Arabic .
 (Dalet without dagesh) is normally pronounced , but occasionally (such as in the Iraqi pronunciation of the words adonai and, in the Shema only, eḥad) , like Arabic  (voiced dental fricative).
 (Ḥet) is pronounced , like Arabic  (voiceless pharyngeal fricative).
 (Tet) is pronounced , like Arabic  (pharyngealized voiceless alveolar stops).
 (Kaph) is pronounced , like Arabic  (voiceless velar fricative).
 (Ayin) is pronounced , like the Arabic  (voiced pharyngeal fricative).
 (Tsade) is pronounced , like Arabic  (pharyngealized voiceless alveolar fricative).
 (Resh) is trilled , even among Baghdadi Jews, who pronounced the equivalent letter in Judaeo-Arabic as a uvular , close to Arabic .
Vowels generally have the same sounds as in Sephardi Hebrew:
Tsere is pronounced .
Holam is pronounced .
Kamatz gadol is pronounced .

The pronunciation of Mizrahi Jews from non-Arab countries differs in some respects.

History

In Talmudic times, it was noted that the Galilean (and maybe Syrian) pronunciation of Hebrew and Aramaic differed from those of both Judaea and Babylonia, principally by the loss of distinct sounds for the guttural letters he, ḥet and ʿayin. That feature is still found in Samaritan Hebrew.

After the Arab conquest of Palestine and Mesopotamia, much work was done by the Masoretes in standardising and refining the pronunciation of Biblical Hebrew, under the influence of the Arabic grammarians of the time. That included establishing the pronunciation of the guttural letters by reference to their Arabic equivalents. Three distinct notations for the vowels were devised: the Palestinian, the Babylonian and the Tiberian, the last of which eventually superseded the others.

The distinctive Babylonian pronunciation of Geonic times is still preserved by Yemenite Jews, but they do not retain the Babylonian notation. In Iraq, it appears to have been superseded by the Palestinian pronunciation (similar to today's Sephardi Hebrew) in or around the 11th century, when the Tiberian notation was adopted: both Saadia Gaon and Jacob Qirqisani report that in their time the Palestinian pronunciation had come to be regarded as standard. Nevertheless, in their reading of unvocalised texts such as the Mishnah, Baghdadi Jews preserve certain peculiarities of the old Babylonian pronunciation, particularly with their choices between dagesh and rafe and between silent and vocal sheva.

The process of assimilation to Arabic went the furthest with the Babylonian Jews. For example, in Classical Arabic and in some spoken dialects including Mesopotamian Arabic, there is no phonemic distinction between a and e, but a phonetic difference is made by the presence of an adjacent emphatic or guttural consonant. Accordingly, the Babylonian notation does not distinguish between patach (in other pronunciations ), segol (in other pronunciations  or ) and sheva na', and the three vowels are still pronounced alike (as ) bu Yemenite Jews. In Levantine Arabic, by contrast, there are distinct "a" and "e" sounds, and both vowels are distinguished in both the Palestinian and the Tiberian notations.

After the expulsion of the Sephardi Jews from Spain in 1492, the exiles took the leading position in most Arab and Ottoman countries, and the local pronunciation of Hebrew assimilated to Sephardi Hebrew in many respects, particularly for pronouncing the vowels.  Today's Iraqi Jews distinguish between patach and segol in the same way as most other Sephardi and Mizrahi Jews. However, distinct sounds for the guttural and emphatic letters and the  sound for bet rafe were retained in many Arab countries, probably under the influence of Arabic.

Iraqi Jews, like Yemenite Jews, retain the Classical Arabic sounds of waw and tav raphe. In other Arab countries, tav raphe is pronounced , which is equally consistent with the pronunciation of both Sephardi Hebrew and of colloquial Arabic.

See also
 Ashkenazi Hebrew
 Hebrew pronunciation of Syrian Jews

Notes

References

Bibliography

Idelsohn, A.Z., Phonographierte Gesänge und Aussprachsproben des Hebräischen der jemenitischen, persischen und syrischen Juden: Vienna 1917
Katz, K., Masoret ha-lashon ha-'Ivrit shel Yehude Aram-Tsova (ִHalab) bi-qeriat ha-Miqra ve-ha-Mishnah (The Hebrew Language Tradition of the Jews of Aleppo in the Reading of the Bible and Mishnah): Jerusalem 1981 (Hebrew) Edah ve-Lashon series vol. 7
Katz, K., Masoret ha-qeri'ah shel qehillat Jerba ba-Miqra u-va-Mishnah (The Hebrew Language Tradition of the Community of Djerba, Tunisia) Edah ve-Lashon series vol. 2
Morag, S., Masoret ha-lashon ha-'Ivrit shel Yehude Bagdad, bi-qeriat ha-Mikra ve-ha-Mishnah (The Hebrew Language Tradition of the Baghdad Community: the Phonology): Jerusalem 1977 (Hebrew) Edah ve-Lashon series vol. 1
S. Morag, 'Pronunciations of Hebrew', Encyclopaedia Judaica XIII, 1120–1145
Yeivin, I., The Hebrew Language Tradition as Reflected in the Babylonian Vocalization: Jerusalem 1985 (Hebrew)

Mizrahi Jewish culture
Hebrew